In Time is a 2011 American science fiction action film written, directed and produced by Andrew Niccol. Amanda Seyfried and Justin Timberlake star as inhabitants of a society which uses time from one's lifespan as its primary currency, with each individual possessing a clock on their arm that counts down how long they have to live. Cillian Murphy, Vincent Kartheiser, Olivia Wilde, Matt Bomer, Johnny Galecki, and Alex Pettyfer also star. The film was released on October 28, 2011.

Plot
In 2169, people are genetically engineered to stop aging on their 25th birthday.  Everyone has a timer on their forearm that shows their remaining time, when it reaches zero the person "times out" and dies instantly. Time has become the universal currency, transferred directly between people or stored in capsules.  The country is divided into areas called Time Zones; Dayton is the poorest, a ghetto where people rarely have over 24 hours on their clocks.  The richest area is New Greenwich, where people are wealthy enough to be effectively immortal.

Will Salas is a factory worker who lives in Dayton with his mother Rachel. One night, he rescues a drunken man named Henry Hamilton from time thieves Fortis and his gang the Minutemen. While hiding, Hamilton reveals to Will that the people of New Greenwich hoard most of the time while constantly increasing prices to keep poorer people dying. The following day, he transfers all but five minutes of his time to a sleeping Will before deliberately timing out and dying.  Raymond Leon, the leader of the police-like Timekeepers, assumes that Will killed Hamilton and pursues him.

Will visits his friend Borel, who warns him against having so much time in Dayton.  He gives Borel ten years, one for each year of their friendship.  Will then sets off to meet his mother, intending to take her with him to New Greenwich.  His mother runs short of time and can't afford bus fare, she is forced to run to meet Will but times out and dies in his arms.  Heartbroken and angry, Will vows to avenge his mother's death by taking the people of New Greenwich for everything they have.

Arriving in New Greenwich, Will meets time-loaning businessman Philippe Weis and his daughter Sylvia at a casino. While playing poker, Will wins over a millennium while nearly timing himself out.  He catches Sylvia's eye and she invites him to a party.  Will is confronted at the party by Timekeeper Leon and arrested. Leon confiscates all but two hours of Will's time, disbelieving that Will didn't kill Hamilton.

Will escapes and takes Sylvia to Dayton as a hostage, but Fortis' gang ambushes and robs them, leaving them with 30 minutes each. Will attempts to get some time back from Borel, but his wife Greta tearfully explains that he has drunk himself to death. They manage to get a day each by selling Sylvia's earrings at a pawn shop. Will then calls Weis to demand a 1,000-year ransom to be paid to the people in Dayton in exchange for Sylvia's safe return. Weis refuses and Will releases Sylvia just as Timekeeper Leon finds Will.  Sylvia shoots Leon in the arm and Will gives him enough time to survive until the other Timekeepers arrive.  Will and Sylvia steal Leon's car and use it to pull over a New Greenwich resident, whom they rob of her time.

Will and Sylvia rob Weis' time banks, giving the time capsules to the needy.  They  soon realize they can't significantly change anything, as prices are raised faster to compensate for the extra time. Fortis' gang ambushes them intending to collect the reward for their capture, but Will kills Fortis and his gang. Will and Sylvia then decide to rob Weis' vault of a one-million year capsule. Leon chases them back to Dayton but fails to stop them from distributing the stolen time; Leon times out, having neglected to collect his day's salary. Will and Sylvia nearly time out themselves but survive by taking Leon's salary.

TV reports show factories in Dayton shutting down as everyone has enough time and abandons their jobs. Having seen the consequences of his obsession with the pair, Leon's colleague Jaeger orders the Timekeepers to return home. Will and Sylvia progress to larger banks, still trying to crash the system.

Cast

 Justin Timberlake as Will Salas, a factory worker who learns the truth about the time system after a chance encounter with a man in a bar.
 Amanda Seyfried as Sylvia Weis, daughter of Phillipe Weis.  She is kidnapped by Will and later becomes his willing accomplice, using her knowledge of her father's business to help them upset the system.
 Cillian Murphy as Timekeeper Raymond Leon, a former resident of the ghetto of Dayton who escaped and became a Timekeeper.
 Alex Pettyfer as Fortis, a thug and time thief who preys on the residents of Dayton.
 Vincent Kartheiser as Philippe Weis, a major banker whose companies control the time system.  
 Olivia Wilde as Rachel Salas, Will's mother.  Her death by timing out in Will's arms motivates Will to attack the time system.
 Matt Bomer as Henry Hamilton, a centenarian who wants to die.  He goes to a bar in Dayton hoping to be killed but is saved by Will.
 Johnny Galecki as Borel, Will's best friend.
 Collins Pennie as Timekeeper Jaeger
 Ethan Peck as Constantin
 Yaya DaCosta as Greta, Borel's wife
 Rachel Roberts as Carrera
 August Emerson as Levi
 Sasha Pivovarova as Clara Weis, Sylvia's grandmother and Philippe's mother-in-law
 Jesse Lee Soffer as Webb
 Bella Heathcote as Michele Weis, Sylvia's mother and Philippe's wife
 Toby Hemingway as Timekeeper Kors
 Melissa Ordway as Leila
 Jessica Parker Kennedy as Edouarda
 Jeff Staron as Oris
 Matt O'Leary as Moser
 Nick Lashaway as Ekman
 Ray Santiago as Victa
 Kris Lemche as Markus
 Laura Ashley Samuels as Sagita

Production
Before the film was titled In Time, the names Now and I'm.mortal were used. On July 12, 2010, it was reported that Amanda Seyfried had been offered a lead role. On July 27, 2010, it was confirmed that Justin Timberlake had been offered a lead role. On August 9, 2010, Cillian Murphy was confirmed to have joined the cast.

The first photos from the set were revealed on October 28, 2010. 20th Century Fox and New Regency distributed the film, and Marc Abraham and Eric Newman's Strike Entertainment produced it.

In an interview with Kristopher Tapley of In Contention, Roger Deakins stated that he would be shooting the film in digital, which makes this the first film to be shot in digital by the veteran cinematographer.

The Dayton scenes were filmed primarily in the Skid Row and Boyle Heights neighborhoods of Los Angeles, while the New Greenwich scenes were filmed primarily in Century City, Bel Air, and Malibu. Although the names of the ghetto-like zone and wealthy enclave reflect Dayton and Greenwich, respectively, the maps used by the Timekeepers are maps of Los Angeles.

For the retrofuturistic setting, the production's vehicle suppliers assembled a fleet of cars and trucks from used car lots and junkyards. Although an old Citroën DS 21 and Cadillac Seville feature, center stage goes to a fleet of seemingly immaculate Dodge Challengers and Lincoln Continentals. The rich drive around in the high gloss Lincolns, all of which have been smoothed, lowered and fitted with oversized disc wheels on low profile rubber. The Dodges are the Time Keeper's cop cars. These too have been smoothed and externally customized, with grilles front and rear covering the lights, and low profile tires on disc wheels. In stark contrast to the Lincolns, paintwork is matte black. A slim police light-bar is fitted internally, behind the windshield.

The use of retrofuturism is one of many elements that the film shares with Niccol's earlier work, Gattaca; Niccol himself referred to it as "the bastard child of Gattaca".  That film also features electrically powered vintage cars (notably a Rover P6 and again, a Citroën DS), as well as buildings of indeterminate age. Gattaca also deals with innate inequalities (though in its case genetic, rather than longevity) and also features a character seeking to cross the divide that his birthright is supposed to deny him. Similarly, he is pursued by law enforcement officers after being wrongly identified as having committed a murder.

Similar works
The series Tales of Tomorrow in 1952 included an episode, "Time to Go" (episode 29), in which aliens from another galaxy, who have learned how to use time as a currency, set up a "time bank" on Earth. The aliens solicit Earthling customers to bank some of their time in the bank in order to earn interest in the form of extended life. However, the aliens use a loophole in the contract with their customers to take all of their time, thus leaving the Earthlings dead. In Harlan Ellison's 1965 short story "Repent, Harlequin!' Said the Ticktockman", the crime of being late is punished by a proportionate amount of time being "revoked" from one's life. The ultimate consequence is to run out of time and be "turned off". This is done by the Master Timekeeper, or "Ticktockman".

Many of the elements of In Time can be found in the 1987 short film The Price of Life, made by Chanticleer Films. Its basic premise and storyline are so similar that In Time has been called an unacknowledged remake of the earlier film. The Price of Life was a 38-minute short film (story by Stephen Tolkin and Michel Monteaux) in which a time account is physically linked to every infant at birth, with death automatic when the balance drops to zero. An elite upper-class is portrayed as living hundreds of years or more. The protagonist is given a certain amount of time as an infant, and as a young boy adds days and years to his time account by buying valuables from people and selling them to visiting tourists from the rich enclave. After his sister dies after gambling away her time, the protagonist (now a young man) sets out on a journey to the enclave of "the Old Ones" in order to save the life of his mother, who is (literally) running out of time. He gets there and meets a beautiful older woman who co-opts him into the immortal lifestyle.

The novel and movie Logan's Run (1976) depict a world where everyone is destroyed when they reach the age of 30 in the film or 21 in the book. The antagonists are Sandmen who hunt Runners trying to avoid destruction.

David Firth's 2008 A Short Cartoon About Time also has the same concept of selling time for monetary gain.

Copyright lawsuit 
On September 15, 2011, a lawsuit was filed against the film by attorneys acting on behalf of Harlan Ellison, author of "Repent, Harlequin!' Said the Ticktockman". The suit, naming New Regency, director Andrew Niccol and a number of anonymous John Does, appears to base its claim on the similarity that both the completed film and Ellison's story concern a dystopian future in which people have a set amount of time to live which can be revoked, given certain pertaining circumstances by a recognized authority known as a Timekeeper. Initially, the suit demanded an injunction against the film's release; however, Ellison later altered his suit to instead ask for screen credit before ultimately dropping the suit, with both sides releasing the following joint statement: "After seeing the film In Time, Harlan Ellison decided to voluntarily dismiss the Action. No payment or screen credit was promised or given to Harlan Ellison. The parties wish each other well, and have no further comment on the matter."

Reception

Critical response
In Time received mixed reviews from critics. Review aggregator Rotten Tomatoes reports that 37% of 174 critics gave the film a positive review, with an average rating of 5.30/10. The website's consensus reads, "In Times intriguing premise and appealing cast are easily overpowered by the blunt, heavy-handed storytelling." Metacritic, which assigns a weighted average score out of 100 to reviews from mainstream critics, gives the film a score of 53 based on 36 reviews. CinemaScore polls reported that the average grade moviegoers gave the film was a "B-minus" on an A+ to F scale. Roger Ebert gave the film a positive review with 3 stars out of 4, noting that the "premise is damnably intriguing", but "a great deal of this film has been assembled from standard elements". Henry Barnes noted that Will is "one of the 99%" and calls the character "a Rolex Robin Hood".

Box office
In Time grossed $12 million on its opening weekend, debuting at number three behind Puss in Boots, and Paranormal Activity 3. The film declined later on during its 14 weekend box office run. The film eventually grossed over $37.5 million in the US and $136.4 million internationally for a worldwide total of $173.9 million.

References

External links

 
 
 
 
 
 Official trailer

2011 films
2011 action thriller films
2011 science fiction action films
20th Century Fox films
American action thriller films
American science fiction action films
American science fiction thriller films
American dystopian films
Dune Entertainment films
Economics and time
Films about time
Films directed by Andrew Niccol
Films involved in plagiarism controversies
Films produced by Marc Abraham
Films scored by Craig Armstrong (composer)
Films set in the 22nd century
Films shot in Los Angeles
Fiction set in the 2160s
Postcyberpunk films
Regency Enterprises films
Transhumanism in film
Films set in Los Angeles
2010s English-language films
2010s American films
Films with screenplays by Andrew Niccol